The following is a list of those in charge of the Ordnance Survey of Great Britain from its inauguration in 1791 to present. The title of the post was originally Superintendent of the  Ordnance Survey (under the Board of Ordnance) but it  evolved during the tenure of Henry James. He was appointed in 1854 as Superintendent 
but he had made himself Director by 1863 
and then Director-General by 1874. More recently, between 1985 and 1991, the title became Director-General and Chief  Executive.

See also
Ordnance Survey

Notes

Ordnance Survey
British geodesists
British surveyors
British cartographers